This Strange Engine is the ninth studio album by the British neo-progressive rock band Marillion, released in April 1997 by the Castle Communications imprint Raw Power. It was the first of the three recordings that Marillion made on a contract with Castle between being dropped by EMI Records in 1995 and eventually going independent in 2000. The album was recorded at The Racket Club in Buckinghamshire, England, between August and November 1996 and was produced by the band themselves.

Background

Without promotional efforts of a major record label, This Strange Engine continued the decline in mainstream success for Marillion, reaching only number 27 in the UK Albums Chart and staying there for three weeks. It sold significantly better in the Netherlands, home of one of the band's most loyal audiences, peaking at number 10 on the charts. Two singles from the album were released: "Man of a Thousand Faces" and "Eighty Days". For the first time in the band's history, no song cracked the UK Top 40 as the first single reached number 98 and the second one failed to chart at all.

The fourth track, "Estonia", was written after singer Steve Hogarth met Paul Barney, who was the only British survivor of the disaster when the cruise ferry Estonia sank in the Baltic Sea on 28 September 1994, killing 852 people. This is the only song of Marillion to feature a balalaika. 

The title track is a tribute by Steve Hogarth to his father, who was a marine engineer and an officer. He sacrificed his life at sea for a job in a coal mine so that he could be close to his family. From its opening scene of the young Steve Hogarth feeding swans, to his father on the deck of his ship seeing the mysteries of the world. 

On European editions, if the last track is carried on playing, at approximately 29:35, there is a hidden track of Hogarth giggling uncontrollably, recorded on his return to the studio after a night on the town.

A remix of the album, Tales from the Engine Room, conducted by the electronic music project Positive Light, was first released as a limited edition January 1998 on Racket Records, and in June 1998 it was released worldwide by Eagle Records.

Track listing

Personnel

Marillion
 Steve Hogarth – vocals, backing vocals, additional keyboards and percussion
 Steve Rothery – guitar
 Pete Trewavas – bass, backing vocals
 Mark Kelly – keyboards, backing vocals
 Ian Mosley – drums, percussion

Additional musicians
 Charlton & Newbottle School Choir – choir (on "Man of a Thousand Faces")
 Tim Perkins – balalaika (on "Estonia")
 Phil Todd – saxophone (on "This Strange Engine")
 Paul Savage – trumpet (on "Hope for the Future")

Technical personnel
 Stewart Every – engineer
 Dave Meegan – mixing engineer
 Andrew Gent – artwork
 Hugh Gilmour – art direction, design

Charts

References

Marillion albums
1997 albums
Neo-progressive rock albums
Castle Communications albums